At least seven vessels of the Royal Navy have borne the name HMS Crane.

  was a 24-gun ship sold in 1629.
  was a galley purchased in North America and sold in 1783.
  was a 4-gun  wrecked in 1808.
  was a  launched in 1809. She foundered with the loss of her entire crew in 1814.
  was a packet brig of 6 guns launched in 1839 and sold in 1862.
  was a  launched in 1896 and broken up in 1919 after the end of World War I.  
  was a modified  sloop launched in 1942 and broken up in 1965.

References

 

Royal Navy ship names